Miguel Zavaleta (Buenos Aires, Argentina, February 16, 1955) is a musician, singer and composer Argentinian rock. 
He led the group of new wave and rock, Suéter, call between 1981 and 2007.

He is the author of most of the successes of Suéter, including: «Amanece en la ruta», «Él anda diciendo», «Comiendo gefilte fish», «Desvanecidos» and «Extraño ser».

After the breakup of the band, Zavaleta, begins his solo career with his first album titled No sé, quizás, suerte, released independently in 2011. It was produced by Palo Pandolfo and Mario Breuer. This disc was not recorded in any record company, so the artist had to hang it on the Internet.

In addition to his solo career, he has participated in over twenty-five recordings of other artists, including: Charly Garcia, Fito Paez, Fabiana Cantilo, Los Twist, Los Auténticos Decadentes, Bersuit Vergarabat, among others.

He had a small role in the US – Argentina co-production film, entitled The Warrior and the Sorceress in 1984, as a Zeg's Guard and was credited as "Michael Zane".

Discography

Suéter 
 Suéter: La reserva moral de Occidente (1982) 
 Lluvia de gallinas (1984)  
 20 caras bonitas (1985) 
 Misión ciudadano 1 (1987) 
 Sueter 5 (1995)

Soloist 
 No lo sé, suerte quizás (2011)
 Volver a nacer (2019)

References

External links 

 

1955 births
20th-century Argentine male singers
Argentine rock singers
Living people
Musicians from Buenos Aires
Rock en Español musicians
Singers from Buenos Aires
Argentine keyboardists
Argentine male singer-songwriters